Tatiane Raquel da Silva (born 10 June 1990) is a Brazilian runner competing primarily in the 3000 metres steeplechase. She has won multiple medals at regional level.

At the 2020 Olympic Games in Tokyo, she broke the Brazilian record in the 3000 metres steeplechase, with a time of 9:36.43.

On June 11, 2022, she broke the South American record for the 3000 metres steeplechase with a time of 9:24.38.

Personal bests
Outdoor
800 metres – 2:06.81 (Uberlandia 2014)
1500 metres – 4:13.38 (Rio de Janeiro 2022)
3000 metres – 9:18.39 (Trujillo 2018)
5000 metres – 15:53.72 (Torrance 2017)
10,000 metres – 33:16.17 (Palo Alto 2018)
3000 metres steeplechase – 9:24.38 (Watford 2022)

International competitions

References

1990 births
Living people
Brazilian female steeplechase runners
Brazilian female long-distance runners
Athletes (track and field) at the 2015 Pan American Games
Athletes (track and field) at the 2019 Pan American Games
Pan American Games athletes for Brazil
South American Championships in Athletics winners
Competitors at the 2017 Summer Universiade
Ibero-American Championships in Athletics winners
Troféu Brasil de Atletismo winners
Athletes (track and field) at the 2020 Summer Olympics
Olympic athletes of Brazil
20th-century Brazilian women
21st-century Brazilian women